Good Citizen or Good Citizens may refer to:

Books
 The Good Citizen, right wing journal 1913-1933
 The Good Citizen (pamphlet), 1947 pamphlet by Leo Burnett
 Good Citizens (book), book by Thich Nhat Hanh

Other
 Good Citizen (album), album by Canadian jazz pianist Kris Davis 2010
 "The Good Citizen" (Flashpoint episode), a 2010 episode of Flashpoint

See also
 Citizen (disambiguation)